Nalini Priyadarshni is an Indian poet and writer.

Literary journals

Poetry Breakfast – Journal of poems Poetry Breakfast – Journal of poems, 2016
Silver Birch Press I Am Waiting Series  Silver Birch Press I Am Waiting Series, 31 December 2014
eFiction India  eFiction India, 2015
Learning and Creativity- Poetry Month Special Learning and Creativity- Poetry Month Special, April, 2015
Read Fingers Read Fingers, 2015
The In-flight Magazine The In-flight Magazine, 2015
Whispers in the Wind Whispers in the Wind, 13 May 2015
Yellow Chair Review Yellow Chair Review, Page 13, August 2015
Calliope Magazine Calliope Magazine, Page 16, March 2015
Verbal Art Verbal Art, Page 153, 2015
The Gambler The Gambler, 28 February 2014
Spring Fling, Scotland's Premier Art and Craft Open Studio Event
 Spring Fling, Scotland's Premier Art and Craft Open Studio Event, 21 May 2015
Haiku Universe Haiku Universe, 2 September 2015
Lipstick party Magazine Lipstick party Magazine, 2015
Beakful | Becquée Beakful | Becquée, 2 February 2015
Iconic Lit Iconic Lit, 14 December 2015
Wax Poetry Art Wax Poetry Art, 2014
Episteme Episteme, Special: Contemporary Women Poetry, September 2015
The Open Road Review Author  The Open Road Review Author
The Asian Signature  The Asian Signature, Interview with Roland Bastien, 2015
The Basil O’ Flaherty  The Basil O’ Flaherty, Interview with Nabina Das 2016
Up The Staircase Quarterly Up The Staircase Quarterly,  issue#23, 2013
eFiction India eFiction India, In Conversation with Dr. Ampat Koshy, 18 April 2015
Writing Raw Writing Raw, 2014
Tell Us a Story Tell Us a Story, 15 April 2015
Elders of Thuban The Muse in all her Colors, 9 October 2014
HIV Here & Now Poem-a-Day countdown to 35 years of AIDS  Poem-a-Day countdown to 35 years of AIDS on 5 June 2016, Poem 277 ± 7 March 2016
The Camel Saloon The Camel Saloon, 20 & 25 May 2014
Duane's Poetree Duane's Poetree, 2 June 2016
Mad Swirl Mad Swirl
Words Surfacing Words Surfacing, Page 39, 2015
Earl of Plaid Court Jester, Golden Bridge, Page 5-8
Random Poem Tree  Random Poem Tree, 29 December 2015
The Murmur The Murmur, April 2015
Festival Of Poetry Festival Of Poetry, 24 November 2015
Writer's Café Writer's Café

Anthologies
Resonating String Published by Authorspress India, Delhi- 
The Significant Anthology Published by Primalogue Publishing Media Private Limited- 
52 Loves 
Resonance 
Contemporary Major Indian Women Poets Published by The Poetry Society Of India 
The Lie of the Land Published by Sahitya Akademi 
From The Ashes Published by Animal Heart Press

References

External links

1974 births
Living people
Poets from Punjab, India
Indian women poets
Writers from Ludhiana
21st-century Indian poets
Women writers from Punjab, India
21st-century Indian women writers